Richard J. Epp is a physicist and lecturer currently working at the University of Waterloo in Waterloo, Ontario, Canada.

Richard Epp received his master's degree in electrical engineering from the University of Manitoba and also completed his PhD in theoretical physics at the same institution on quantum field theory. After finishing graduate school, he held post-doctoral research positions at international institutions including the Raman Research Institute in Bangalore, India and the University of California in Davis, California. Additionally, he is the Senior Manager of Educational Outreach at the Perimeter Institute for Theoretical Physics and is particularly known for being the founder and main lecturer during the International Summer School for Young Physicists program (ISSYP) held at the University of Waterloo and the Perimeter Institute for Theoretical Physics every year.

Research contributions
Richard Epp has worked on many different areas of physics, ranging from quantum mechanics to black holes and general relativity. The following is a list of papers published according to institution:
University of Manitoba
Dirac versus Reduced Quantization of the Poincare Symmetry in Scalar Electrodynamics
University of California - Davis
On the interpretation of time re-parametrization-invariant quantum mechanics
The symplectic structure of general relativity in the double null (2+2) formalism
Raman Research Institute
Angular momentum and an invariant quasilocal energy in general relativity
University of Waterloo
A New Approach to Black Hole Microstates
A Statistical Mechanical Interpretation of Black Hole Entropy Based on an Orthonormal Frame Action
Rigid motion revisited: rigid quasilocal frames

References 

Canadian physicists
Living people
Year of birth missing (living people)